Albert William Mays (18 July 1902 – 1959) was a Welsh footballer. Born in Ynyshir, he played professionally for clubs including Bristol City, Wrexham and Walsall between 1923 and 1932, making a total of 160 Football League appearances. He also gained one cap for Wales, against Northern Ireland in 1929.

References

Welsh footballers
Wales international footballers
1902 births
1959 deaths
Margate F.C. players
Bristol City F.C. players
Plymouth Argyle F.C. players
Wrexham A.F.C. players
Notts County F.C. players
Burnley F.C. players
Walsall F.C. players
Halifax Town A.F.C. players
Gresley F.C. players
Association footballers not categorized by position